Associação Boquinhense de Desportos, commonly known as Boquinhense, is a Brazilian football club based in Boquim, Sergipe state.

History
The club was founded on October 11, 1965.

Stadium
Associação Boquinhense de Desportos play their home games at Estádio Temístocles Carvalho, nicknamed Temistão. The stadium has a maximum capacity of 3,000 people.

References

Association football clubs established in 1965
Football clubs in Sergipe
1965 establishments in Brazil